The Memorial Presbyterian Church is located at 202 E. Mantua Avenue in the borough of Wenonah in Gloucester County, New Jersey. The church was designed by architect Isaac Newton Pursell in Late Gothic Revival style and built in 1904. It was added to the National Register of Historic Places on August 7, 2013, for its significance in architecture.

See also
National Register of Historic Places listings in Gloucester County, New Jersey

References

Wenonah, New Jersey
Churches in Gloucester County, New Jersey
Presbyterian churches in New Jersey
Gothic Revival church buildings in New Jersey
National Register of Historic Places in Gloucester County, New Jersey
Churches on the National Register of Historic Places in New Jersey
New Jersey Register of Historic Places
Churches completed in 1904